Parrilli is an Italian surname. Notable people with the surname include:

Dellamarie Parrilli (born 1949), American artist
Luigi Parrilli
Nanci Parrilli (born 1953), Argentine politician
Oscar Parrilli (born 1951), Argentine lawyer and politician

Italian-language surnames